Takbaş is a village in Tarsus district of Mersin Province, Turkey. At  it is situated in Çukurova (Cilicia of the antiquity). Çukurova Motorway is to the north and Turkish state highway  is to the south of the village. The population of the village is 1003  as of 2011. It is a typical Çukurova village cotton and fresh vegetables being the main crops.

References

Villages in Tarsus District